Julius ( Yaakov Shlomo/ Jacob Solomon) Steinfeld (October 10, 1884 – March 25, 1974) was born in Neunkirchen, Austria. He later moved to Vienna where he became the head of the community's Agudath Israel. He was also known as the shtadlan from Vienna.

After the Anschluss in 1938, Steinfeld toiled to help Jews emigrate from Austria. With great personal risk Julius negotiated with Adolf Eichmann to obtain exit visas for Jews trying to flee Nazi Austria. His courageous interventions on behalf of his fellow Jews, led to his imprisonment by Eichmann. His cousin Emil Deutsch succeeded in bailing him out of prison. In coordination with Rabbi Dr. Solomon Schonfeld, Julius was instrumental in arrangements for the kindertransport where thousands of Jewish children were sent from Vienna to England. Julius had left Vienna and returned many times during the Nazi period in order to procure entry visas to nearly 30 countries throughout the world including Palestine, the United States and England. All in all almost 9,000 Jews were helped to emigrate due to his efforts.

Steinfeld endangered his life by staying in Nazi Austria until he was informed that he would be deported if he did not leave. He left Vienna on May 9, 1941. Due to his extensive negotiations with the Nazis the U.S. Department of State initially suspected he was a German spy and refused to grant him a visa. He found refuge in Cuba until 1942 when the State Department was convinced that his contacts with the Nazis were used only to save lives. He settled in the Williamsburg section of Brooklyn, NY.

In the U.S. he continued his rescue work to save European Jews from the Holocaust by joining the Vaad Hatzalah of the Agudath Harabbanim. Julius was active in the Vienner shul of Williamsburg which was founded by his son-in-law Karl Richter and was modeled after the famous Ashkenaz Schiff Shul in Vienna of which Julius and Karl were active members of and that was destroyed by the Nazis on Kristallnacht.

Steinfeld died in Brooklyn, New York, on March 25, 1974.

References

Bibliography 
 They Called Him Mike by Yonason Rosenblum, Mesorah Publications, 1995. .
 Holocaust Hero: The Untold Story of Solomon Schonfeld, an Orthodox British Rabbi by David Kranzler, Ktav Publishing House, 2003. .
 Thy Brothers Blood: The Orthodox Jewish Response During the Holocaust by David Kranzler, Mesorah Publications, 1987. .

People who rescued Jews during the Holocaust
Austrian Orthodox Jews
American Orthodox Jews
Jewish emigrants from Austria to the United States after the Anschluss
Jewish activists
Austrian activists
People from Neunkirchen District, Austria
People from Brooklyn
1884 births
1974 deaths